The Blue Brain Project is a Swiss brain research initiative that aims to create a digital reconstruction of the mouse brain. The project was founded in May 2005 by the Brain and Mind Institute of École Polytechnique Fédérale de Lausanne (EPFL) in Switzerland. Its mission is to use biologically-detailed digital reconstructions and simulations of the mammalian brain to identify the fundamental principles of brain structure and function.

The project is headed by the founding director Henry Markram—who also launched the European Human Brain Project—and is co-directed by Felix Schürmann, Adriana Salvatore and Sean Hill. Using a Blue Gene supercomputer running Michael Hines's NEURON, the simulation involves a biologically realistic model of neurons and an empirically reconstructed model connectome.

There are a number of collaborations, including the Cajal Blue Brain, which is coordinated by the Supercomputing and Visualization Center of Madrid (CeSViMa), and others run by universities and independent laboratories.

Goal

The initial goal of the project, which was completed in December 2006, was the creation of a simulated rat neocortical column, which is considered by some researchers to be the smallest functional unit of the neocortex, which is thought to be responsible for higher functions such as conscious thought. Rat neocortical columns are very similar in structure but contain only 10,000 neurons and 108 synapses. Between 1995 and 2005, Markram mapped the types of neurons and their connections in such a column.

Progress

By 2005, the first cellular model was completed. The first artificial cellular neocortical column of 10,000 cells was built by 2008. By July 2011, a cellular mesocircuit of 100 neocortical columns with a million cells in total was built. A cellular rat brain had been planned for 2014 with 100 mesocircuits totalling a hundred million cells. A cellular human brain equivalent to 1,000 rat brains with a total of a hundred billion cells has been predicted to be possible by 2023.

In November 2007, the project reported the end of the first phase, delivering a data-driven process for creating, validating, and researching the neocortical column.

In 2015, scientists at École Polytechnique Fédérale de Lausanne (EPFL) developed a quantitative model of the previously unknown relationship between the glial cell astrocytes and neurons.  This model describes the energy management of the brain through the function of the neuro-glial vascular unit (NGV).  The additional layer of neuron-glial cells is being added to Blue Brain Project models to improve functionality of the system.

In 2017, Blue Brain Project discovered that neural cliques connected to one another in up to eleven dimensions. The project's director suggested that the difficulty of understanding the brain is partly because the mathematics usually applied for studying neural networks cannot detect that many dimensions. The Blue Brain Project was able to model these networks using algebraic topology.

In 2018, Blue Brain Project released its first digital 3D brain cell atlas which, according to ScienceDaily, is like "going from hand-drawn maps to Google Earth", providing information about major cell types, numbers, and positions in 737 regions of the brain.

In 2019, Idan Segev, one of the computational neuroscientists working on the Blue Brain Project, gave a talk titled: "Brain in the computer: what did I learn from simulating the brain." In his talk, he mentioned that the whole cortex for the mouse brain was complete and virtual EEG experiments would begin soon. He also mentioned that the model had become too heavy on the supercomputers they were using at the time, and that they were consequently exploring methods in which every neuron could be represented as an artificial neural network (see citation for details).

In 2022, scientists at the Blue Brain Project used algebraic topology to create an algorithm, Topological Neuronal Synthesis, that generates a large number of unique cells using only a few examples, synthesizing millions of unique neuronal morphologies. This allows them to replicate both healthy and diseased states of the brain. In a paper Kenari et al. were able to digitally synthesize dendritic morphologies from the mouse brain using this algorithm. They mapped entire brain regions from just a few reference cells. Since it is open source, this will enable the modelling of brain diseases and eventually, the algorithm could lead to digital twins of brains.

Software
The Blue Brain Project has developed a number of software to reconstruct and to simulate the mouse brain.

Blue Brain Nexus 
Blue Brain Nexus is a data integration platform which uses a knowledge graph to enable users to search, deposit, and organise data. It stands on the FAIR data principles to provide flexible data management solutions beyond neuroscience studies. It is an open source software and available for everyone on GitHub.

BluePyOpt 
BluePyOpt is a tool that is used to build electrical models of single neurons. For this, it uses evolutionary algorithms to constrain the parameters to experimental electrophysiological data. Attempts to reconstruct single neurons using BluePyOpt are reported by Rosanna Migliore, and Stefano Masori. It is an open source software and available for everyone on GitHub.

CoreNEURON 
CoreNEURON is a supplemental tool to NEURON, which allows large scale simulation by boosting memory usage and computational speed. It is an open source software and available for everyone on GitHub.

NeuroMorphoVis 
NeuroMorphoVis is a visualisation tool for morphologies of neurons. It is an open source software and available for everyone on GitHub.

SONATA 
SONATA is a joint effort between Blue Brain Project and Allen Institute for Brain Science, to develop a standard for data format, which realises a multiple platform working environment with greater computational memory and efficiency. It is an open source software and available for everyone on GitHub.

Funding 
The project is funded primarily by the Swiss government and the Future and Emerging Technologies (FET) Flagship grant from the European Commission, and secondarily by grants and donations from private individuals. The EPFL bought the Blue Gene computer at a reduced cost because it was still a prototype and IBM was interested in exploring how applications would perform on the machine. BBP was viewed as a validation of the Blue Gene supercomputer concept.

Related projects

Cajal Blue Brain 

The Cajal Blue Brain Project is coordinated by the Technical University of Madrid led by Javier de Felipe and uses the facilities of the Supercomputing and Visualization Center of Madrid and its supercomputer Magerit. The Cajal Institute also participates in this collaboration. The main lines of research currently being pursued at Cajal Blue Brain include neurological experimentation and computer simulations. Nanotechnology, in the form of a newly designed brain microscope, plays an important role in its research plans.

Documentary
Noah Hutton created the documentary film In Silico over a 10-year period. The film was released in April 2021. The film covers the "shifting goals and landmarks" of the Blue Brain Project as well as the drama, "In the end, this isn’t about science. It’s about the universals of power, greed, ego, and fame."

See also 

 Artificial intelligence
 BRAIN Initiative
 CoDi
 Cognitive architecture
 Cognitive science
 Google Brain
 Human Brain Project
 List of artificial intelligence projects
 Neuroinformatics
 Noogenesis
 Outline of brain mapping
 Outline of the human brain
 Project Joshua Blue
 Simulation argument
 Simulated reality
 Social simulation
 Whole brain emulation

References

Further reading 

 
 
 
 Growing a Brain in Switzerland, Der Spiegel, 7 February 2007
 Out of the Blue -- Can a thinking, remembering, decision-making, biologically accurate brain be built from a supercomputer?, Seed Magazine, March 2008
 Reconstructing the Heart of Mammalian Intelligence  Henry Markram's Lecture, March 4, 2008.
 The Blue Brain Project  Henry Markram's Lecture, Neuro Informatics 2008.
 The Blue Brain Project  an Interview with Idan Segev.
 Simulated brain closer to thought  BBC News 22 April 2009
 Firing Up the Blue Brain -"We Are 10 Years Away From a Functional Artificial Human Brain" Luke McKinney, July 2009
Henry Ankara builds a brain in a supercomputer TED Conference. July 2009
Indian startup to help copy your brain on computers Silicon India. 1 February 2010

External links 

 Blue Brain Project site, Lausanne.
 FAQ on Blue Brain.
 NCS documentation.
 NEURON documentation.
Blue Brain Portal - Knowledge Space for Neuroscience
 Out of the Blue, SEEDMAGAZINE.Com
 Cajal Blue Brain Project

Neuroinformatics
IBM supercomputers
Computational neuroscience
Virtual reality organizations
Cognitive modeling
École Polytechnique Fédérale de Lausanne